The 2006–07 West Virginia Mountaineers men's basketball team represented West Virginia University from Morgantown, West Virginia in the 2006-07 season. After impressive finishes in the Sweet Sixteen and Elite Eight the last two years, the Mountaineers seemed poised to improve on those last two seasons, opening with a 10-1 nonconference schedule. Only to post a 9-7 in Big East conference play, placing 7th. After a loss in the quarterfinals of the Big East tournament, the Mountaineers would accept an invitation to the National Invitation Tournament, where they would win the championship. Following the season, coach John Beilein would depart to become the next head coach at Michigan. Beilein would be replaced by current WVU coach Bob Huggins.

Postseason Results

Big East conference Tournament
First Round Vs. Providence - W, 92-79 @ Madison Square Garden, New York, NY
Quarterfinals Vs. Louisville - L, 71-82 2OT @ Madison Square Garden, New York, NY
National Invitation Tournament
First Round Vs. Delaware State - W, 74-50 @ WVU Coliseum, Morgantown, WV
Second Round Vs. Massachusetts - W, 90-77 @ WVU Coliseum, Morgantown, WV
Quarterfinals Vs. NC State - W, 71-66 @ WVU Coliseum, Morgantown, WV
Semifinals Vs. Mississippi State - W, 63-62 @ Madison Square Garden, New York, NY
Championship Vs. Clemson - W, 78-73 @ Madison Square Garden, New York, NY

References

West Virginia
West Virginia Mountaineers men's basketball seasons
National Invitation Tournament championship seasons
West Virginia Mountaineers men's basketball
West Virginia Mountaineers men's basketball